The 1998–99 Tunisian Ligue Professionnelle 1 season was the 73rd season of top-tier football in Tunisia.

Results

Group A

Group A table

Group A result table

Group A leaders

Group B

Group B table

Group B result table

Group B leaders

Championship Playoffs

League table
Group winners (Espérance de Tunis and Club Africain) obtained 2 bonus points each and group runners-up (CA Bizertin and CS Sfaxien) obtained 1 bonus point each.

Result table

Leaders

Relegation Playoffs

Relegation playoffs table
Teams that finished the regular season in the 5th place of each group (CO Transports and CS Hammam-Lif) obtained 2 bonus points each and those that finished in the 6th place of each group (Olympique Béja and ES Beni-Khalled) obtained 1 bonus point each.

Relegation playoffs result table

References
1998–99 Ligue 1 on RSSSF.com

Tunisian Ligue Professionnelle 1 seasons
Tun